Saint-Pons-de-Mauchiens is a commune in the Hérault department in the Occitanie region in southern France.

Geography
A tiny village perched on a hill, St. Pons de Machines is a typical example of the circulade type of village dating back to the eleventh and twelfth centuries. The Bishops of Agde built the city castle in 1199. A fine mill, the "Moulin de Roquemengarde" on the river Hérault is only 4 km away. To really escape from the modern world, there is a recently restored footpath (17 km), nicely marked,  leading from the village environs right out into the hilly garrigue countryside, perfumed with thyme, lavender and rosemary.

History
There is a legend about the village's name. One of the castle's lords owned a pack of ferocious dogs ("chiens" in French) that he let loose at nightfall. One day, he arrived home late and the castle doors were locked. The dogs did not recognize their master, savagely attacking his throat, tearing him to pieces. His last words were "Mauvais chiens !" The village is called St-Pons-de-MAUCHIENS, machines being an abbreviation of 'Mauvais chiens'.

Population

Sport
Saint-Pons-de-Mauchiens has Hérault's only cricket club, allowing league and friendly play against visiting touring sides. The club also demonstrates and coaches cricket in local village schools.

Personalities
Marie Sagnier, born February 28, 1898, at St-Pons-de-Mauchiens, d. 1996. Righteous among the Nations for saving Jewish children in her then primary school at Murat (Cantal), Auvergne In French

See also
Communes of the Hérault department

References

External links

Village blog
Photographs by Georgia Glynn Smith
History of the village
Cricket club site

Communes of Hérault